Chaetanthus aristatus is a species of rush (in the family Restionaceae). 
It is found in Western Australia.<ref name=florabase>{{FloraBase|name=Chaetanthus aristatus|id=17685}}</ref>

The species was first described as Leptocarpus aristatus in 1810 by Robert Brown, but was transferred in 1998 by Barbara Briggs and L.A.S. Johnson to the genus, Chaetanthus''.

References

Restionaceae
Flora of Western Australia
Plants described in 1810
Taxa named by Robert Brown (botanist, born 1773)